Art of Spain is a BBC Four documentary series on Spanish art presented by Andrew Graham-Dixon.  It consists of three one-hour episodes, and premiered on 31 January 2008.

Episodes

Reception
Rosie Jackson of Open Magazine said that "the programme proffers the best bits of Spanish art minus the tourists and the baking heat", and that the series is "undoubtedly a visual feast; low-brow, but none the worse for that."

"If only all presenters were as good as Andrew Graham-Dixon." Continuing her praise for the host of the series, Serena Davies of The Daily Telegraph said that his "genial, eloquent presence was an asset to even the most over-familiar shot of the Alhambra."

References

External links
 
  

2008 British television series debuts
2008 British television series endings
2000s British documentary television series
BBC television documentaries about history
Spanish art
Documentary films about the visual arts
2000s British television miniseries
English-language television shows